Air Force Base Waterkloof {AFB Wklf} is an airbase of the South African Air Force. It is situated on the outskirts of Pretoria, and is the SAAF's busiest airbase. The base's name, Waterkloof, is Afrikaans. It means Water Ravine in English.

The base motto is Acquirit Qui Tuetur (He Obtains Who Defends).

Units currently hosted

 2 Squadron – Fighter, attack, reconnaissance
 21 Squadron – VIP transport
 28 Squadron – Medium transport
 41 Squadron – Light transport
 44 Squadron – Light transport
 60 Squadron – In-flight refuelling, transport, EW/ELINT/AEW
 111 Squadron – Light transport (reserve)
 140 Squadron – Light transport (reserve)
 504 Squadron – Security
 5 Air Servicing Unit – Maintenance support
 Central Photographic Institute – Photographic services
 JARIC, (Joint Air Reconnaissance Intelligence Centre) The SANDF National Imagery Exploitation Centre – Strategic Imagery Intelligence (IMINT) support
 Mobile Deployment Wing – Emergency response
 SAAF Telecommunications Centre – Communications
 Ditholo Training Area is managed as an external component of AFB Waterkloof

History

The base was officially opened on 1 August 1938 as Waterkloof Air Station.
Since that time it has always been in the service of the SAAF. It was upgraded to Air Force Base during World War II.

Aviation
 Non-directional beacon – WL315.0
 VHF omnidirectional range – WKV116.9
 Tower – 124.1

Controversy

A flight full of Indian citizens who had come to attend a wedding of the Gupta family landed at Waterkloof airbase. This was in contravention of South African law since the airbase is classified as a National Key Point. It was later alleged that former president Jacob Zuma is the one who ordered the flight to land.

References

Notes

External links

Waterkloof page on the unofficial website of the South African Airforce  Checked 29 March 2012

South African Air Force bases
Airports in South Africa
Transport in Gauteng
City of Tshwane Metropolitan Municipality